The 2014–15 FIU Panthers women's basketball team represents Florida International University during the 2014–15 NCAA Division I women's basketball season. The Panthers, led by thirty-fifth year head coach Cindy Russo, play their home games at FIU Arena, and were members of Conference USA. They finished the season 3–26, 0–18 in C-USA play to finish in last place. They failed to qualify for the Conference USA women's tournament.

Roster

Schedule

|-
!colspan=9 style="background:#002D62; color:#C5960C;"| Exhibition

|-
!colspan=9 style="background:#002D62; color:#C5960C;"| Regular season

See also
2014–15 FIU Panthers men's basketball team

References

FIU Panthers women's basketball seasons
FIU
FIU Panthers women's basketball team
FIU Panthers women's basketball team